Monica Ngezi Mbega (born 22 April 1956) is a Tanzanian CCM politician and Member of Parliament for Iringa Mjini constituency in the National Assembly of Tanzania since 1995.

References

1956 births
Living people
Chama Cha Mapinduzi MPs
Tanzanian MPs 2010–2015
Place of birth missing (living people)